The place Louis-Lépine is a square in the 4th arrondissement of Paris on the île de la Cité. It is bounded by the rue de la Cité (east), rue de Lutèce (south), rue Aubé (west), the quai de la Corse (north), and is crossed by the allée Célestin-Hennion. It is named after 
Louis Lépine, a notable prefect of the Paris police. The Metro station Cité has its only entrance on the square. It is the venue for the Marché aux fleurs Reine-Elizabeth-II, a flower and bird market.

The prefecture of police is a large building located between the Place Louis Lépine and the Quai du Marché neuf. This building was built as a barracks for the Garde républicaine from 1863 to 1867 (architect Pierre-Victor Calliat) and was occupied by the Prefecture in 1871.

Sources
Translated from the French Wikipedia.

Sister projects

Louis Lepine
Buildings and structures in the 4th arrondissement of Paris
Île de la Cité